Prophetstown State Park commemorates a Native American village founded in 1808 by Shawnee leaders Tecumseh and his brother Tenskwatawa north of present-day Lafayette, Indiana, which grew into a large, multi-tribal community. The park features an open-air museum at Prophetstown, with living history exhibits including a Shawnee village and a 1920s-era farmstead. Battle Ground, Indiana, is a village about a mile east of the site of the Battle of Tippecanoe in 1811, a crucial battle in Tecumseh's War which ultimately led to the demise of Prophetstown. The state park was established in 2004 and receives about 335,000 visitors annually.

History
The park was first proposed in 1989 but did not receive funding from the Indiana legislature until 1994. Land acquisition continued through 1999 when the legislature funded $3.7 million to create the park. Indiana Governor Joe Kernan formally dedicated the park in 2004. The campground opened the following year and was a partnership with Lafayette as part of the Lafayette Inn tax proceeds. Construction of the aquatic park began in October 2012 and was completed in 2013 after lobbying by local officials to drive more visitors to the park and Tippecanoe County.

Facilities and activities

 Historic Prophetstown farmstead, a 1920s living history farm.
 Woodland Indian settlement with replicas of a Shawnee council house and medicine lodge
 Hiking trail
 Bicycle trail
 Interpretative naturalist services
 Picnic areas and shelters
 Camping, with 110 campsites and a dumping station

References

External links 
Indiana Department of Natural Resources' official Web page
The Farm at Prophetstown

Protected areas established in 2004
State parks of Indiana
Native American museums in Indiana
Farm museums in Indiana
Museums in Tippecanoe County, Indiana
Protected areas of Tippecanoe County, Indiana
2004 establishments in Indiana